Hashimoto-san is a fictional Japanese mouse created by the Japanese-born animator Bob Kuwahara and Eli Bauer for the Terrytoons animation company.  Hashimoto is a judo instructor living in Japan with his wife Hanako, son Saburo, and daughter Yuriko.

The first cartoon in the series, Hashimoto-san, was a seven-minute short released theatrically on September 6, 1959. Fourteen cartoons were produced, ending with Spooky-Yaki, which was released on November 13, 1963.

Hashimoto is an expert in judo and the ninja arts, but never used his skills to harm anyone. He also frequently told stories about Japan to an American reporter named G.I. Joe aka Joey or Joey-San.

Hashimoto and the other characters in the series were voiced by John Myhers. All of the shorts were directed by Kuwahara. Bob Kuwahara had an intimate knowledge of Hashimoto's culture through his own family ties.

Between 1963 and 1965 the shorts were incorporated into The Hector Heathcote Show as part of NBC's Saturday morning cartoon lineup. During the mid-1960s Hashimoto had his own board game, and also appeared in a handful of comic books published by Gold Key Comics; always with other Terrytoon characters like Deputy Dawg or Hector Heathcote.

Some episodes contained scenes whose artwork reflected Japan's traditional ukiyo-e woodblock prints.

To date the Hashimoto-san series has not been released on DVD, though a bootleg DVD is available containing 12 of the 14 episodes.

Neil Young often had Hashimoto cartoons playing in the auditoriums where he was performing in concert to entertain the crowd before the show and during intermissions.

Filmography
Fourteen cartoons were produced between 1959 and 1963, directed by Bob Kuwahara, Dave Tendlar, Connie Rasinski, Mannie Davis and Art Bartsch.
 Hashimoto-San (Sept 6, 1959) - Kuwahara & Tendlar
 House of Hashimoto (Nov 30, 1960) - Rasinski
 Night Life in Tokyo (Feb 1961) - Davis
 So Sorry, Pussycat (March 1961) - Bartsch
 Son of Hashimoto (April 12, 1961) - Rasinski
 Strange Companion (May 12, 1961) - Davis
 Honorable Cat Story (Nov 1961) - Rasinski
 Honorable Family Problem (March 30, 1962) - Kuwahara
 Loyal Royalty (May 18, 1962) - Kuwahara
 Honorable Pain in the Neck (Aug 22, 1962) - Kuwahara
 Tea House Mouse (Jan 1963) - Kuwahara
 Pearl Crazy (May 1963) - Kuwahara
 Cherry Blossom Festival (June 17, 1963) - Kuwahara
 Spooky-Yaki (Nov 13, 1963) - Kuwahara

References 

Terrytoons characters
Fictional mice and rats
Fictional judoka
Fictional Japanese people
Film characters introduced in 1959
Male characters in animation
Animated characters introduced in 1959
Japan in non-Japanese culture